Helen Pearse-Otene is a New Zealand Māori playwright, film actor, author and psychologist.

Biography
Pearse-Otene grew up in South Auckland, New Zealand. She studied at Victoria University of Wellington and Toi Whakaari, and holds a PhD from Massey University. She is a registered psychologist. She is affiliated to Ngāti Rongomaiwahine, Ngāti Kahungunu, Ngāpuhi, Te Rarawa, Ngāti Kuri and Ngāti Ruanui iwi.

In 1999 she and her partner Jim Moriarty founded a theatre company called Te Rākau Hua o te Wao Tapu Trust, which works in prisons, youth residential homes and on marae. It is New Zealand’s longest-running independent Māori theatre company. Her theatre practice has been influenced by Te Rākau's kaupapa Māori, founded on the principles of Te Tiriti o Waitangi and influenced by features of  Bertolt Brecht's Epic Theatre, such as direct address, minimal technology and the aim of social change, also a purpose of Augusto Boal's Theatre of the Oppressed.

As both script-writer and workshop facilitator, Pearse-Otene has in-depth experience of applying ensemble movement and chorus to the work of Te Rākau as well as integrating waiata and kapa haka, through Marae Theatre. Earlier examples of this theatre form include Rowley Habib's play, The Death of the Land, performed in marae and community halls, and In the Wilderness Without a Hat by Hone Tūwhare, directed by Don Selwyn, and set at a marae tangihanga.

Although the work of Te Rakau uses marae features such as pōwhiri, it is performed in a range of venues: kāinga, schools, prisons, youth justice residential and community centres, as well as mainstream theatres throughout Aotearoa. Through ensemble work, the aim is to craft evocative theatre that honours Māori expressions of colonisation, trauma and social justice. The genre includes traditional and contemporary Māori performing arts, applied theatre and therapeutic encounter.

As an actor, Pearse-Otene showed her interest in exploring the history of Aotearoa from a Maori perspective by performing the role of Faith in 1981 by John Broughton, a production directed by Toni Waho at Centrepoint Theatre in Palmerston North. The following year Pearse-Otene performed in Duty Free by Ngarupiki Reid, directed by Tanea Heke, which had a fortnight season at BATS Theatre. In 1998 she also performed the role of Ellie in Tricyle, which Pearse-Otene co-wrote with Mark Sant and Anne Nordhaus.

As a playwright, Pearse-Otene aims to present the past, present and future complexity of collective history in Aotearoa. The Undertow involves a 180 year journey through six generations of one Wellington-based family in a quartet of plays: The Ragged, Dog & Bone, Public Works and The Landeaters. Pearse-Otene carried out  extensive research for the play including settlers’ and Armed Constabulary diaries, newspaper articles, and ngā kupu tuku iho (oral histories) of local Iwi. The Undertow was presented at Soundings Theatre at Te Papa: The Museum of New Zealand as a quartet in 2017."So why is it called THE UNDERTOW? Because even as we strive toward a safe shore, the past pulls us back, tugging at our collective conscience? Because our health, safety and longevity depend on our recognising the hard-to-face truths that surge beneath the surface?"   It was filmed by cinematographer Waka Atewell and edited into a four part television series that aired on Māori Television in 2019. "

Pearse-Otene is a novel writer; she has published two graphic novels in a series called Matawehi Fables: Meariki and Arohanui. The novels are published in English and in te reo Māori.

Theatre productions 
1988  - Through structured devising processes,  Kia Maumahara and Watea (Good for Something) evolved into public performances at Arohata Prison in Christchurch. The collective memories and testimony of Māori and Pacific Island working-class women focussed on their oppression, especially sexual abuse.

2000 - Purotu, the Magic Within was devised with young people in care at the Northern Residential Centre, using dialogue scenes interspersed with individual song /rap etc 

2001 - Te Ahika O Te Manatu Rangatahi was created in Kaikōura, focussing especially on teenage angst.

2002 -  Te Waka Toi o Ngati Toa was a youth project for a large cast focussing on  themes of abandonment, violence, sexual abuse and addiction through 18 scripted sequences, rap, breakdancing and beat-boxing as well as traditional haka and waiata.

2005  - The Battalion- Ka Whawhai Tonu Matau Ake! Ake! Ake!, scripted by Pearse-Otene, involves 'suitcase', storytelling theatre with minimal props. Two youth at risk are helping an old man clean up a marae for a Maori Battalion reunion as a frame for flashbacks to troubling war experiences.

2008 -  Ka Mate, Ka Ora, scripted by Pearse-Otene, is based on the Vietnam War with a veteran who becomes mad (pōrangi). His memories are interwoven with the ghost of Te Rauparaha.

2017 - The Undertow - The Ragged, Dog & Bone, Public Works and The Landeaters at Te Papa: The Museum of New Zealand scripted by Pearse-Otene

Publications 

 Pearse-Otene, Helen (2020). "Theatre Marae" (PDF). MAI A New Zealand Journal of Indigenous Scholarship. vol 9 issue 3: 226–336 .MAI_Jrnl_2020_V9_3_Otene_FINAL.pdf 
Pearse-Otene, H. (2020). The underTOW. Wellington, N.Z: Te Rākau Hua O Te Wao Tapu Trust.
Pearse-Otene, H., & Burdan, A. (2015). Meariki: Te rapunga i te pono. Wellington, N.Z: Huia Publishers.
Pearse-Otene, H., Burdan, A., & Morrison, S. (2013). Te huakore: Te muna o te whatu. Wellington, N.Z: Huia mō Te Tāhuhu o te Mātauranga.
Burdan, A., Pearse-Otene, H., Teepa, K., & McNaughton, T. O. P. (2012). Arohanui. Te Whanganui-a-Tara, Aotearoa: He mea whakaputa tēnei tuhinga e Huia Publishers.

Awards and recognition 
In 2010, Pearse-Otene won "Best Female Actor - Feature Film" at Wairoa Māori Film Festival for her role in No Petrol, No Diesel!.

References

Living people
Ngāpuhi people
Te Rarawa people
Ngāti Ruanui people
Ngāti Kahungunu people
Victoria University of Wellington alumni
Toi Whakaari alumni
Massey University alumni
Ngāti Rongomaiwahine people
New Zealand Māori writers
People from the Auckland Region
Year of birth missing (living people)